The 6th Division was a unit of the Reichswehr.

Creation 
In the Order of 31 July 1920 for the Reduction of the Army (to comply with the upper limits on the size of the military contained in the Treaty of Versailles), it was determined that in every Wehrkreis (military district) a division would be established by 1 October 1920. The 6th Division was formed in January 1921 out of the Reichswehr-Brigaden 7 and 10, both part of the former Übergangsheer (Transition Army). 

It consisted of 3 infantry regiments, the 16th, 17th and 18th Infantry Regiments. It also included the 6th (Prussian) Artillery Regiment, an engineering battalion, a signals battalion, a transportation battalion and a medical battalion. It was subordinated to Gruppenkommando 2. 

The commander of the Wehrkreis VI was simultaneously the commander of the 6th Division. 
For the leadership of the troops, an Infanterieführer and an Artillerieführer were appointed, both subordinated to the commander of the Division.

Divisional commanders 

General of the Infantry Friedrich von Lossberg 1 October 1920 - 1 January 1925
General of the Infantry Leopold Freiherr von Ledebur 1 January 1925 - 28 February 1928
General of the Artillery Max Föhrenbach 1 March 1928 - 1 May 1931
Generalleutnant Wolfgang Fleck 1 May 1931 - 30 September 1934

Infantrieführers  
Generalleutnant Otto Haas (1 Oct 1920 - 2 Aug 1921)
Generalleutnant Erwin Voigt (3 Aug 1921 - 30 Sep 1923)
Generalmajor Ernst Freiherr von Forstner (1 Oct 1923 - 31 Mar 1927)
Generalmajor Lothar Fritsch (1 Apr 1927 - 31 Jan 1929)
Generalleutnant Max von Schenckendorff (1 Feb 1929 - 31 Jan 1930)
Generalmajor Hans Schmidt (1 Feb 1930 - 31 Jan 1931)
Generalleutnant Franz von Roques (1 Feb 1931 - 30 Sep 1933)
Oberst Erwin von Witzleben (1 Oct 1933 - 31 Jan 1934)
Generalmajor Konrad von Gossler (1 Feb 1934 - 30 Sep 1934)
Generalmajor Wilhelm Keitel (1 Oct 1934 - 30 Sep 1935)
Generalleutnant Adolf Strauss (1 Oct 1935 - 15 Oct 1935).

The unit ceased to exist as such after October 1934, and its subordinate units were transferred to the 21 Divisions newly created in that year.

Garrisons 
The divisional headquarters was in Münster.

References

 Feldgrau.com

Infantry divisions of Germany
Military units and formations established in 1920
Military units and formations disestablished in 1934